Sangrur Assembly constituency (Sl. No.: 108) is a Punjab Legislative Assembly constituency in Sangrur district, Punjab state, India. Constituency consists of Sangrur, Bhawanigarh and other nearby villages. Current MLA from constituency is Narinder Kaur Bharaj of the Aam Aadmi Party.

History
Sangrur constituency was formed in 1957.

Demographics
It is categorized as general and semi-urban constituency. According to the report of the Delimitation Commission, 2008, there is around 28.26% Scheduled Caste population in constituency. A total of 420 square kilometers area and 1,89,838 electors are covered by constituency.

Members of the Legislative Assembly

Election results

2022

2017

2012

2007

2002

References

External links
  

Assembly constituencies of Punjab, India
Sangrur district